The Toyota TF110 is an un-raced Formula One car designed by Toyota Racing for the 2010 Formula One season.  The car had been designed, and two chassis produced before Toyota officially decided to pull out of Formula One at the end of the 2009 Formula One season. One chassis was damaged by former team principal John Howett, while the other was used for a shakedown test. Various teams attempted to purchase the chassis.

Shakedown
The overall competitiveness of the car compared with other 2010 Formula One cars is unknown. Former Williams driver Kazuki Nakajima completed a shakedown of the TF110 at Cologne, Germany. The car was said to feature a rear-F-duct, and "one of the most extreme rear diffusers seen" and also a ride height adjustment system.

Pirelli speculation
When Pirelli was awarded the contract to take over the exclusive supply of tyres to Formula One from 2011 onwards, there was great speculation that the Italian manufacturer would purchase an old or unraced F1 car to allow for some testing ahead of the official F1 test window. They had been initially linked with purchasing an old BMW Sauber chassis, but were later linked with Toyota and using the TF110. The idea was that using the Toyota would mean no team gained an unfair data advantage. Pirelli decided to use the 2009 Toyota TF109 for their testing with Nick Heidfeld at the wheel.

Chassis purchase attempts
Various teams attempted to purchase the Toyota TF110 chassis for use in Formula One.  The first attempt at using the car came from Serbian-based outfit Stefan GP. The team, led by Zoran Stefanović bought into the old Toyota F1 project for their technical knowledge. The team had hoped to purchase the TF110s to use in the 2010 season.  One of the TF110s was painted red, and fired up for the first time on February 19. The team had intended to launch and test its car on 25 February regardless of whether or not its application to the grid was successful.  The test was scheduled to take place at Portimao, with Kazuki Nakajima at the wheel. Stefan GP were refused entry to race in Formula One, and never given official Formula One specification tyres by Bridgestone.

Hispania Racing, already in Formula One, considered buying the chassis following their split with car designers Dallara.  Their boss Jose Ramon Carabante made several visits to Cologne but never sealed a deal to buy. Durango also considered purchasing the units for use in the 2011 Formula One season but they were not given an entry slot for the season.

References

External links
Images of the Toyota TF110 In Portuguese

Toyota Formula One cars
Formula One cars that never raced